Fear Factor is a British game show based on the Dutch game show Now or Neverland and part of the international Fear Factor franchise. It was broadcast on Sky One from 3 September 2002 to 22 August 2004 and was presented by Ed Sanders.

Format
As the show started, Sanders gives an opening statement, and this is one most commonly used:

Then, he gives a verbal disclaimer. The wording has changed with certain versions, but also, this is one most commonly used:

This version has two teams of three contestants. They are known as the red team and the green team. They all take part individually in the first stunt, chosen randomly by Ed. In the second stunt, two contestants from each team chosen by their opponents do it, and in the third and final stunt, it can vary.

In the first stunt, the four contestants from any team that complete a stunt in the fastest time would bank their teams £3,000. In the second stunt, the contestants who completes a stunt would bank their teams £3,000. And in the third and final stunt, the person from any team, or the team that complete a stunt in the fastest time would bank their teams £5,000 and win the total money.

For its third and final series, the programme became Celebrity Fear Factor, with each team now consisting of three celebrities playing for charity.

Filming
The first series was filmed in Cape Town, South Africa, while the 2nd & 3rd series was filmed in Buenos Aires, Argentina.

Transmissions

References

External links

2000s British game shows
2002 British television series debuts
2004 British television series endings
British television series based on American television series
Fear Factor
Sky UK original programming
Television series by Banijay
Television shows filmed in South Africa
Television shows filmed in Argentina